Kullhad may refer to:
Kulhar, traditional terracotta from India and Pakistan 
Kullħadd, newspaper from Malta